is a shōnen manga based on dodgeball, by Tetsuhiro Koshita, which was serialized in CoroCoro Comic. It was adapted into an anime from 1991 to 1992, and eight video game adaptations.

Characters

Video games
 Honō no Tōkyūji: Dodge Danpei (March 28, 1992, Famicom, published by Sunsoft)
 Honō no Tōkyūji: Dodge Danpei (April 24, 1992, Game Boy, published by Hudson Soft)
 Honō no Tōkyūji: Dodge Danpei (July 10, 1992, Mega Drive, published by Sega)
 Honō no Tōkyūji: Dodge Danpei (July 31, 1992, Super Famicom, published by Sunsoft)
 Honō no Tōkyūji: Dodge Danpei (August 7, 1992, Game Gear, developed by Sims, published by Sega)
 Honō no Tōkyūji: Dodge Danpei (September 25, 1992, PC Engine, developed by AIM, published by Hudson Soft)
 Honō no Tōkyūji: Dodge Danpei 2 (March 26, 1993, Famicom, published by Sunsoft)
 Pigu-Wang Tongki M (피구왕통키M "Dodgeball King Tongki M") (September 6, 2018, Android/iOS, developed by Snowpipe)

See also
 List of anime distributed by TV Tokyo
 Noriko Hidaka
 Tesshō Genda

References

External links
 
 

1989 manga
Bandai Visual
1991 anime television series debuts
Dodgeball mass media
Shogakukan franchises
Shōnen manga